"Fire" is a song by German hard dance band Scooter, released on 27 March 1997 as the first single from their fourth album, Age of Love (1997).

Critical reception
British magazine Music Week rated the song four out of five, writing, "The German outfit mesh thrashing guitars with a pumping dance beat, giving off enough energy to rip the roof off. Should blaze a trail into the Top 30."

Track listings

Original version

 CD maxi
 "Fire" – 3:31
 "Fire" (Extended Emergency) – 5:10
 "Choir Dance" – 4:19
 "Fire Dub 1" – 4:59

 Limited CD maxi
 "Fire" – 3:31
 "Fire" (Extended Emergency) – 5:10
 "Choir Dance" – 4:19
 "Fire Dub 1" – 4:59
 "Hyper Hyper" (live) – 5:02

 12-inch
 "Fire" (Extended Emergency) – 5:10
 "Fire Dub 1" – 4:59
 "Fire Dub 2" – 5:12

 Cassette
 "Fire" – 3:31
 "Fire" (Extended Emergency) – 5:10

 US CD maxi
 "Fire" (album version) – 3:31
 "Fire" (Extended Emergency) – 5:10
 "Fire" (Klubbheads remix) – 6:53
 "Fire" (DONS Burn Rubber mix) – 6:32
 "Fire Dub 2" – 5:12

 French CD single
 "Fire" – 3:31
 "Fire Dub 1" – 4:59

 US 12-inch
 "Fire" (Extended Emergency) – 5:10
 "Fire" (Klubbheads remix) – 6:53
 "Fire" (album version) – 3:31
 "Fire" (DONS Burn Rubber mix) – 6:32
 "Hyper Hyper" (live) – 5:02

Charts

Weekly charts

Year-end charts

Certifications and sales

References

Scooter (band) songs
1997 singles
1997 songs
Songs written by H.P. Baxxter
Songs written by Jens Thele
Songs written by Rick J. Jordan